Grammatrain is an alternative rock band from Seattle, Washington who were active in the Christian rock industry in the 1990s. After disbanding in 1998, the group reunited as a mainstream act in 2009 and released their third full-length album entitled Imperium the following year.

History
Singer/guitarist Pete Stewart, bassist Dalton Roraback and his drummer brother Paul Roraback recorded a self-titled three-song demo tape in 1994. After hearing the demo, ForeFront Records label executive Eddie DeGarmo signed the band.  Before releasing their first major album, Grammtrain released a CD containing four studio recordings and five live acoustic numbers. In 1995 they released their first studio album, Lonely House, produced by Aaron Sprinkle. The album achieved success on Christian radio.

Their second full-length album, Flying, was released in 1997. Critics cited the album's "lighter, more polished feel" when compared to Lonely House. At the end of a tour promoting the album, Grammatrain officially broke up following their final live performance on December 7, 1998 in Germany. An announcement of the breakup can be heard on the band's live album.

Following the breakup of the band, Stewart released a self-titled solo album and produced Michael Tait's band, Tait, performing on their first album. He also produced four tracks on the debut solo album for TobyMac, Momentum. In 2003 Stewart reemerged with The Accident Experiment.

Reunited
In early 2009, Grammatrain announced that they had reunited and were in the process of recording a new album.  Because frontman Pete Stewart had left the Christian faith, the new album was not directed at Christian audiences. Shortly after the announcement, the band played two reunion shows: one in Seattle and one in Germany. A limited-edition EP with songs from the forthcoming album was released at the shows and on the band's website.

In 2010, the single "The Last Sound" was released; the video was debuted at a Seattle Sounders FC match. The song has been played at Qwest Field before the kickoff of Sounders matches, and Sounders FC owner Drew Carey endorsed the song and promised to get a "proper video" made of it. The video was produced and directed by Nik Venet, who had previously done videos for U2, Jane's Addiction and The White Stripes. The song was also picked up by and released through Rock Band Network for the Xbox 360.

On October 10, 2010, they independently released their newest album, Imperium.

Discography
 Demo Tape - 1994
 Grammatrain - 1995
 Lonely House - 1995
 Flying - 1997
 Live 120798 - 1999, Review: HM Magazine
 Kneeling Between Shields (EP) - 2009
 The Last Sound (single) - 2010
 Imperium - 2010
 Spin Automatic (EP) - 2010

Grammatrain has also appeared on ForeFront Records' Ten, The Birthday Album compilation album, as well as tribute albums to Stryper, Petra, and Larry Norman.

References

External links
 
 
Artist profile on Cross Rhythms

American post-grunge musical groups
Grunge musical groups
Musical groups from Seattle